Alexander Robertus Todd, Baron Todd  (2 October 1907 – 10 January 1997) was a British biochemist whose research on the structure and synthesis of nucleotides, nucleosides, and nucleotide coenzymes gained him the Nobel Prize for Chemistry in 1957.

Early life and education
Todd was born in Cathcart in outer Glasgow, the son of Alexander Todd, a clerk with the Glasgow Subway, and his wife, Jane Lowry.

He attended Allan Glen's School and graduated from the University of Glasgow with a BSc in 1928. He received a PhD (Dr.phil.nat.) from Johann Wolfgang Goethe University of Frankfurt am Main in 1931 for his thesis on the chemistry of the bile acids.

Todd was awarded an 1851 Research Fellowship from the Royal Commission for the Exhibition of 1851, and, after studying at Oriel College, Oxford, he gained another doctorate in 1933.

Career
Todd held posts with the Lister Institute, the University of Edinburgh (staff, 1934–1936) and the University of London, where he was appointed Reader in Biochemistry.

In 1938, Alexander Todd spent six months as a visiting professor at California Institute of Technology, eventually declining an offer of faculty position. Todd became the Sir Samuel Hall Chair of Chemistry and Director of the Chemical Laboratories of the University of Manchester in 1938, where he began working on nucleosides, compounds that form the structural units of nucleic acids (DNA and RNA).

In 1944, he was appointed to the 1702 Chair of Chemistry in the University of Cambridge, which he held until his retirement in 1971. In 1949, he synthesised adenosine triphosphate (ATP) and flavin adenine dinucleotide (FAD). Todd served as a visiting professor at the University of Chicago in Autumn 1948 and University of Sydney in 1950.

In 1955, he helped elucidate the structure of vitamin B12, although the final formula and definite structure was determined by Dorothy Hodgkin and her team, and later worked on the structure and synthesis of vitamin B1 and vitamin E, the anthocyanins (the pigments of flowers and fruits) from insects (aphids, beetles) and studied alkaloids found in hashish and marijuana. He served as chairman of the Government of the United Kingdom's advisory committee on scientific policy from 1952 to 1964.

He was elected a Fellow of Christ's College, Cambridge in 1944 and was Master from 1963 to 1978. He became Chancellor of the University of Strathclyde in 1975, and a visiting professor at Hatfield Polytechnic (1978–1986). Among his many honours, including over 40 honorary degrees, he was elected as a Fellow of the Royal Society in 1942,  a member of the United States National Academy of Sciences in 1955, a member of the American Academy of Arts and Sciences in 1957, and the American Philosophical Society in 1965. He was President of the Royal Society from 1975 to 1980 and became a member of the Order of Merit in 1977.

In 1981, Todd became a founding member of the World Cultural Council.

Personal life and death

In 1937, Todd married Alison Sarah Dale (d.1987), daughter of Nobel Prize winner Sir Henry Dale, who, as Todd did, served as president of the Royal Society of London. They had a son, Alexander Henry, and two daughters, Helen Jean and Hilary Alison.

Todd died in Cambridge on 10 January 1997 at the age of 89 following a heart attack.

Honours
Todd was honoured as a Nieuwland Lecturer at the University of Notre Dame in 1948, an Arthur D. Little Visiting Professor at Massachusetts Institute of Technology in 1954, and a Hitchcock Lecturer at University of California, Berkeley, in 1957.

He was knighted as Sir Alexander Todd in 1954 and was created a Life Peer as Baron Todd of Trumpington in the County of Cambridge on 16 April 1962.

He is commemorated by a blue plaque erected by the Royal Society of Chemistry at the Department of Chemistry in the University of Cambridge.

Bibliography

See also
 Atherton–Todd reaction
 History of RNA biology
 List of RNA biologists
 List of presidents of the Royal Society

References

Further reading
 : "The Era of Todd, Plumb and Snow", by Sir David Cannadine.

External links

 Obituary in the Independent
 Obituary in The New York Times
 including the Nobel Lecture, 11 December 1957 Synthesis in the Study of Nucleotides

. Video of an interviewed with Lewis Wolpert. Duration 37 minutes.
The Papers of Lord Todd held at Churchill Archives Centre

1907 births
1997 deaths
Academics of the University of Edinburgh
Academics of the University of Hertfordshire
Academics of the University of London
Academics of the Victoria University of Manchester
Alumni of Oriel College, Oxford
Alumni of the University of Glasgow
British Nobel laureates
Fellows of the Royal Society of Edinburgh
Fellows of the Royal Society
Foreign associates of the National Academy of Sciences
Foreign Members of the Russian Academy of Sciences
Foreign Members of the USSR Academy of Sciences
Founding members of the World Cultural Council
Knights Bachelor
Life peers
Masters of Christ's College, Cambridge
Members of the Austrian Academy of Sciences
Members of the Order of Merit
Nobel laureates in Chemistry
People associated with the University of Strathclyde
People educated at Allan Glen's School
Scientists from Glasgow
Presidents of the British Science Association
Presidents of the Royal Society
Recipients of the Copley Medal
Recipients of the Pour le Mérite (civil class)
Royal Medal winners
Scottish biochemists
Scottish biologists
Scottish chemists
Scottish Nobel laureates
Professors of chemistry (Cambridge, 1702)
Goethe University Frankfurt alumni
People from Oakington
People from Trumpington
20th-century biologists
Vitamin researchers
Life peers created by Elizabeth II
Members of the American Philosophical Society